Patricia A. Goodrich (January 13, 1933March 31, 1999) was an American politician and homemaker.  She served as secretary of the Wisconsin Department of Health and Social Services in the cabinet of Governor Tommy Thompson, and earlier served ten years in the Wisconsin State Assembly.

Biography

Born in Jefferson City, Missouri, Goodrich was educated at Jefferson City Junior College and Park College. Goodrich moved to Berlin, Wisconsin.

She served in the Wisconsin State Assembly for five terms, from 1975 to 1985, as a Republican, representing Green Lake and Waushara counties. During her years in the Assembly she served alongside Tommy Thompson, who represented the neighboring district.

When Tommy Thompson later became Governor, he appointed Goodrich as Deputy Secretary of the Wisconsin Department of Health and Social Services.  She would become Acting Secretary when her predecessor, Timothy Cullen, left office in 1988. Thompson later appointed her as Cullen's permanent replacement.  Her appointment was controversial with some anti-abortion activists in Thompson's Republican base, due to her outspoken pro-choice record.  She was confirmed and ultimately served in the role from mid 1988 through early 1991.

Goodrich died in Gold Canyon, Arizona. She was survived by her husband, Bud, and her three sons, Phil, Jim, and John.

Notes

|-

1933 births
1999 deaths
People from Jefferson City, Missouri
People from Berlin, Wisconsin
Women state legislators in Wisconsin
State cabinet secretaries of Wisconsin
20th-century American politicians
20th-century American women politicians
Republican Party members of the Wisconsin State Assembly